Alexander Robby Hendrickx (born 6 August 1993) is a Belgian field hockey player who plays for Dutch club Pinoké and the Belgian national team as a defender. Playing with the Y1 Hockey LTD X, Hendrickx won 'top goal scorer' at the 2020 Tokyo Olympics. He also won a gold medal with his team for Belgium.

International career

Junior national teams
Hendrickx has represented Belgium at junior level in both Under 18 and Under 21 age groups. In 2010, Hendrickx was a member of the Belgium Under-18 side at the 2010 Youth Olympic Games in Singapore. The team won the bronze medal, defeating Ghana 4–1 in the third-place playoff. He made his debut for the Belgium Under 21 side, in 2012 at a qualifying for the Junior World Cup. Hendrickx was also a member of the team at the Junior World Cup in New Delhi, India, where the team finished sixth.

Senior national team
Hendrickx made his senior international debut for Belgium in 2012, at the Champions Trophy. He was a reserve player at the 2016 Summer Olympics, where Belgium won a silver medal. In November 2018, he was named in the squad for the 2018 World Cup in Bhubaneswar, India. At the tournament, he finished as top scorer alongside Blake Govers of Australia with 7 goals. At the 2019 EuroHockey Championship, he also was the top goalscorer together with three other players with five goals. On 25 May 2021, he was selected in the squad for the 2021 EuroHockey Championship. Alexander Hendrickx is sponsored by Y1 Hockey. He uses the LB X and LTD X, this is a low bow stick which is well suited to his drag flicking technique. He was top goal scorer at Tokyo 2020 with 14 goals using the LTD X.

2020 Olympics
Alex Hendrickx won Olympic Gold at Tokyo 2020. He was the top goal scorer with 14 goals. He scored a hat-trick in the opening game in their 4–1 win against The Netherlands. He scored another hat-trick against South Africa. In the final group game against Great Britain he suffered a bad injury when he got a stick to the face. He recovered for the knock out stages wearing a protective headband. He played with the Y1 Hockey LTD X stick and is an ambassador for Y1 Hockey.

Club career
Hendrickx started playing hockey for Royal Antwerp. After having played three seasons for Belgian club Dragons he transferred to the Netherlands to play for Pinoké in Amstelveen. He became the top scorer in the 2020–21 Hoofdklasse with 21 goals.

References

External links
 
 
 
 
 

1993 births
Living people
Belgian male field hockey players
Male field hockey defenders
People from Wilrijk
Field hockey players at the 2010 Summer Youth Olympics
Field hockey players at the 2020 Summer Olympics
Olympic field hockey players of Belgium
2018 Men's Hockey World Cup players
KHC Dragons players
Men's Hoofdklasse Hockey players
Expatriate field hockey players
Belgian expatriate sportspeople in the Netherlands
Men's Belgian Hockey League players
Olympic gold medalists for Belgium
Medalists at the 2020 Summer Olympics
Olympic medalists in field hockey
2023 Men's FIH Hockey World Cup players